Reena is an Indian actress best known for her work in Malayalam cinema. She was one of the lead actress during the late 1970s. She has acted in more than 100 film along with several popular television series in Malayalam and Tamil languages. She has also acted in few Tamil and Telugu movies as well.

Personal life

Reena was born to Peter Reskyuna and Jessy in 1958 at Edappilly, Kochi. Her father was from Mangalore and mother was from Kochi, Kerala. She has a brother, Ivan. She did her primary schooling in Mangalore. She pursued bachelor's degree from Madras Presentation College, Perumbavoor. She remains unmarried. She resides at Chennai with family.

Career

She started her career at 14, in Chukku movie as Sheela's daughter. She started production company, V.I.C and produced movies Druvasankamam, Ente Kadha and Janapriyan. Now she is acting in  Tele films and soap operas. Currently she is acting in Ammayariyathe serial in Asianet.

Partial filmography

Malayalam

 Uduppu
 Ennalum Sarath (2018) as Nun
 Clint (2017) as Chinnamma's mother
 Fukri (2017) as Hajira
 Senior Mandrake (2010) as Archive footage
 Njan Salperu Ramankutty (2004) as Sangeetha's mother 
 Priyam Priyamkaram (2004) as Alice's mother
 Snehapoorvam (2004)
 CID Moosa (2003) as Chief Minister's wife
 Pulival Kalyanam (2003) as Doctor
 Sahodaran Sahadevan (2003) as Yamuna's mother
 Sadanandante Samayam (2003) as Sumangala's mother 
 Ente Ammakku (2003) as Anuradha's mother
 Kalyanaraman (2002) as Thampi's relative
 Kunjikoonan (2002) as Lakshmi's mother
 Dany (2001) as
 The Gift of God (2001)
 Oru Apoorva Pranayakatha (2001)
 Sathyameva Jayathe (2000) as Nancy's mother
 Life is Beautiful (2000) as Suraj's mother
 Snehapoorvam Anna (2000) as Jomon's mother
 Arayannangalude Veedu (2000) as Rajan's wife
 Joker(2000) as Padmini
 Narasimham (2000) as Anuradha's mother
 Dreamz (2000) as Roy's sister
 Sparsham (1999)
 Crime File (1999) as Amala's mother
 Pathram (1999) as Vasundhara Thampi 
 Veendum Chila Veettukaryangal (1999) as Beena
 Ezhupunna Tharakan (1999) as Leenamma
 Deepasthambham Mahascharyam (1999) as Indu's mother
 Vazhunnor (1999) as Mable
 Gaandhiyan (1999) as Divya's mother
 Ilamura Thampuran (1998) as Devakikunjamma
Manthri Maalikayil Manasammatham (1998) as Asha's mother
 Gloria Fernandes From U.S.A. (1998) at Leenamma
 Punjabi House (1998) as Manninder Singh's wife
 Summer in Bethlehem (1998) as Abhirami's step mother
 Kallu Kondoru Pennu (1998) as Suresh's sister
 Achammakuttiyude Achayan (1998) as Alice
 Harikrishnans (1998) as Meera's mother
 Ayal Kadha Ezhuthukayanu (1998) as Priyadarshini's mother
 Chandralekha (1997) as Shobha
 Kilukil Pambaram (1997) as Bhageerathibhai Thamburatti
 Guru (1997) as Old Queen
 Newspaper Boy (1997) as Kanakam
 Kalyanapittennu (1997) as Bhanu
 Ancharakalyanam (1997) as Madhavi
 Aattuvela (1997) as Malu's mother 
 Varnapakittu (1997)  as Kuruvilla's wife
 Oru Yathramozhi (1997) as Sreeni's wife
 Junior Mandrake (1997) as Sudharma
 Kannur (1997)
 Ishtamaanu Nooru Vattam (1996) as Prasad's mother
 Indraprastham (1996) as Doctor
 Kanjirappally Kuriachan (1996) as Valsamma
 Devaraagam (1996) as Doctor 
 Mimics Super 1000 (1996) as  Arundathi Varma
 Kumkumacheppu (1996) as Nalini
 Ee Puzhayum Kadannu (1996) as Anjali's mother
 Thumbolikkadappuram (1995) as Thomichayan's wife
 Minnaram (1994) as Reena
 Ulppathi (1984) 
 Aadyathe Anuraagam (1983) as Sushamma
 Ente Katha (1983) as Usha
 Ankuram (1982) as Raji
 Thuranna Jail (1982) as Mercy
 Ivan Oru Simham (1982) as Omana
 Idiyum Minnalum (1982) 
 Madrasile Mon (1982) 
 Agnisaram (1981) as Latha
 Dhruvasangamam (1981) as Valsala
 Poochasanyaasi (1981) as Maithili
 Karimbana (1980) as Thankamma
 Pralayam (1980) as Kusumam
 Ithikkarapakki (1980) as Sainabha
 Pavizhamuthu (1980) as Geetha
 Puzha (1980)
 Ezham Kadalinakkare (1979) as Latha
 Oru Raagam Pala Thaalam (1979) as Priya
 Ajnaatha Theerangal (1979) as Urmila
 Pocketadikkari (1979)
 Aayiram Vasanthangal (1979)
 Indharadhanussu (1979)
 Pathivritha (1979)
 Beena (1978) as Betty Fernandez
 Thamburatti (1978) as Rema, Leela (double role)
 Aanappaachan (1978) as Usha
 Urakkam Varaatha Raathrikal (1978) as Malathy 
 Snehikkan Samayamilla (1978) 
 Hemantha Rathri (1978) 
 Praarthana (1978)
 Vadakakku Oru Hridayam (1978)
 Bhrashtu (1978)
 Aasramam (1978)
 Aniyara (1978)
 Nirakudam (1977) as Usha
 Oonjaal (1977) as Sharada
 Yudhakaandam (1977) as Kala
 Raajaparampara (1977) 
 Minimol (1977) as Rajamma
 Varadakshina (1977) 
 Ivanente Priyaputhran (1977) 
 Rowdy Rajamma (1977) 
 Vezhambal (Ahalyamoksham) (1977)
 Aaraadhana (1977)
 Prasaadam (1976) as Meenakshi
 Amritavahini (1976) as Thulasi
 Ammini Ammavan (1976) as Hema
 Yudhabhoomi (1976)
 Kaayamkulam Kochunniyude Makan (1976) as Savithrikutty
 Anavaranam (1976) 
 Priyamvadha (1976)
 Raajankanam (1976)
 Agnipushpam (1976) 
 Pravaaham (1975) as Ragini
 Makkal (1975) as Parvathy
 Penpada (1975) as Latha
 Love Letter (1975) 
 Love Marriage (1975) 
 Boy Friend (1975) 
 Chief Guest (1975)  
 Priyamulla Sophia (1975)  
 Chandanachola (1975) 
 Velicham Akale (1975)  
 Tourist Bunglawu (1975)
 Chattakkari (1974) as Llin
 Vrindavaanam (1974) 
 Chukku (1973)

Tamil
 Ninaithu Ninaithu Parthen (2007) as Farzana's mother
 Cheena Thaana 001 (2007) as Thamizharasu's Mother
 Varalaru (2006) as Saroja
 Pudhiya Geethai (2003) as Sarathy's Professor
 Sishya (1997) as Pooja's mother
 Karuppu Nila (1995) as Divya's mother
 Naan Potta Savaal (1980) as Roopa
 Rishi Moolam (1980) as Thangam
 Swapna (1980) as Kalpana
 Kuruvikoodu (1980) as Radha
 Vallavan Varugiran (1979) as Thara
 Imayam (1979) as Narmada
 Thirisoolam (1979) as Nalini
 Ore Vaanam Ore Bhoomi (1979) as Latha
 Manmadha Leelai (1976) as Anju
 Aval Oru Thodar Kathai (1974) as Sumathi (Credited as Vinothini)

Telugu
  Ethe Naasaval (1984) as Roopa
  Aalaya Sikharam (1983) as Bhanu
  Swapna (1981) as Kalpana 
  Asadyalaku Asadyudu  (1981) as Thara 
  Manavudu Mahaneeyudu (1980)
  Maro Charitra (1978) - Photo only

Kannada
 Swapna (1981)

Hindi
 Virasat (1997) as Raja's wife

Television career

References

External links

Reena at MSI
Cinidiary.com

Actresses in Malayalam cinema
Indian film actresses
Actresses from Mangalore
Actresses in Tamil cinema
Actresses in Telugu cinema
1958 births
Living people
Actresses in Kannada cinema
20th-century Indian actresses
21st-century Indian actresses
Indian television actresses
Actresses in Malayalam television
Actresses in Tamil television